Bert Schenk (born 14 November 1970 in Berlin, Germany) was a German boxer.

Professional career
Schenk turned pro in 1996 and won the WBO Middleweight Title on 30 January 1999 against Freeman Barr by 4th-round TKO. Otis Grant had vacated the belt to fight Roy Jones Jr. for the WBC/WBA light heavyweight titles, leaving the belt vacant for Schenk and Barr to fight.  Schenk was stripped of the belt for not defending, and later lost the following year to Armand Krajnc when he recovered.

See also
List of middleweight boxing champions

External links
 

1970 births
Living people
Middleweight boxers
World middleweight boxing champions
World Boxing Organization champions
Boxers from Berlin
German male boxers